N'deye Mareame Sarr (or Farr) was a German citizen of Senegalese background who was shot dead by a police officer in the town of Aschaffenburg in 2001. Her killing was announced by the police as an act of self-defence, whereas black German organizations saw it as murder.

Killing 
On 14 July 2001, N'deye Mareame Sarr went to her ex-husband's house in Aschaffenburg to look for the two year old child they were bringing up together. According to the police report, she forced her way into the house and when she refused to leave, her ex-husband called the police. When two police officers arrived, she allegedly attacked one officer with a knife and was subsequently shot by the other in the upper body. She then died of her injuries.

Organizations such as the Black Students Organization (BSO), the African Refugees Association (ARA) and Struggles of Students (SOS) disputed the police account, asking why two officers were unable to calm Sarr down using other methods. Further, they queried if it was necessary to shoot her in the chest and not in her leg or arm. For them, the killing was murder and because Sarr had a Senegalese background they saw a racist element to her death. The groups also questioned why Sarr's mother was not permitted to see the corpse and why the police officer who killed her had not been suspended.

Jungle World newspaper suggested that Sarr died because the police were using newly introduced Polizei-Einsatz-Patrone (PEP) bullets which were designed to cause maximum damage to the person who was shot. The Bavarian Ministry of the Interior rejected this interpretation of events.

Legacy 
Sarr's death has been linked to other deaths of black Germans in custody such as Slieman Hamade, Oury Jalloh, Dominique Koumadio, Christy Schwundeck and Ousman Sey.

References 

2001 deaths
People shot dead by law enforcement officers in Germany
Senegalese emigrants to Germany
Women in Germany